Shi-Ting Wang was the defending champion but lost in the first round to Maria Vento.

Dominique Van Roost won in the final 6–1, 6–3 against Lenka Němečková.

Seeds
A champion seed is indicated in bold text while text in italics indicates the round in which that seed was eliminated.

  Dominique Van Roost (champion)
  Henrieta Nagyová (second round)
  Tamarine Tanasugarn (second round)
  Shi-Ting Wang (first round)
  Yuka Yoshida (second round)
  Sarah Pitkowski (quarterfinals)
  Rachel McQuillan (semifinals)
  Adriana Gerši (first round)

Draw

External links
 1997 Wismilak International Draw

Commonwealth Bank Tennis Classic
1997 WTA Tour